Human composting is a process for the final disposition of human remains in which microbes convert a deceased body into compost. It is also called natural organic reduction (NOR) or terramation.

Although the natural decomposition of human corpses into soil is a long-standing practice, a more rapid process that was developed in the early 21st century entails encasing human corpses in wood chips, straw, and alfafa until thermophile microbes decompose the body. In this manner, the transformation can be sped up to as little as 1–2 months. The accelerated process is based in part on techniques developed for the composting of livestock.

Though human composting was common before modern burial practices and in some religious traditions, contemporary society has tended to favor other disposition methods. However, cultural attention to concerns like sustainability and environmentally friendly burial has led to a resurgence in interest in direct composting of human bodies. Some religious and cultural communities have been critical of this modern composting practice, even though it is in many ways a return to more traditional practices. Human composting is legal in Sweden and in multiple US states, and natural burials without a casket or with a biodegradable container are common practice in Muslim and Jewish traditions and are allowed in the UK, the US, and many other locations throughout the world.

Reception 
Proponents say human composting is more economical, environmentally friendly, and respectful of the body and the earth than the methods of disposal that are typically practiced in technologically advanced societies. Cremation uses fossil fuels or large amounts of wood for funeral pyres (which generates polluting smoke and releases large amounts of carbon), and conventional burial is land-intensive, has a high carbon footprint, and frequently involves disposing of bodily fluids and liquefied organs in the sewer and injecting the body with toxic embalming chemicals. By contrast, human composting, like natural burial, is a natural process and contributes ecological value by preserving the body's nutrient material. Some have argued that "natural organic reduction respects the human body and spirit, supports rather than sullies the earth, and works with nature rather than against it."

Critics say the rapid decomposition process is inappropriate for human bodies. The Catholic Church in the United States, for example has argued that it does not confer the respect due to bodily remains, though other Catholics have maintained that human composting "fulfill[s] in a more direct way the Biblical declaration that we are dust and to dust we shall return (Genesis 3:19)." Orthodox Jewish interpretations of Halakha religious law oppose the sped-up composting process, saying it lacks appropriate reverence for the dead, with the matter under debate in other variations of Judaism.

Muslim burial practices ordinarily involve natural burials without embalming or cremation. They involve prompt washing of the corpse, wrapping it in a simple plain-cloth shroud, and rapid burial without a casket, with some soil placed under the body. Jewish burial practices are very similar. If a casket is used in a Jewish burial, the casket is generally simple and made of unfinished wood, and strictly-observant practice avoids all use of metal; the wood parts of the casket are joined by wood dowels rather than nails. Caskets are not used in Israel.

Katrina Spade, founder of the Urban Death Project, has promoted the idea of human composting and studied methods for the process. Since 2017 the Urban Death Project has operated out of the U.S. state of Washington under the name Recompose. Recompose has applied for a patent on their process. Two other businesses in the state of Washington, called Return Home and Earth, also offer human composting  Washington was the first U.S. state to allow the practice.

Legal status 
Human composting is legal in Sweden and multiple US states, and natural burials without a casket or with a biodegradable container are allowed in the UK, the US, and many other locations throughout the world.

In the United States, rapid human composting has become legally allowed or approved to become allowed in the future in six states 
 Washington (approved in May 2019, taking effect on May 1, 2020)
 Colorado (approved in May 2021, taking effect on August 8, 2021)
 Oregon (approved in June 2021, taking effect on January 1, 2022)
 Vermont (approved in June 2022, taking effect on January 1, 2023)
 California (approved on September 18, 2022, to take effect in 2027)
 New York (approved on December 31, 2022, pending further regulatory action)

References 

Burials
Funeral-related industry
Legal aspects of death
Waste management